is the service mark of Japan Post and its successor, Japan Post Holdings, the postal operator in Japan. It is also used as a Japanese postal code mark since the introduction of the latter in 1968. The mark is a stylized katakana syllable te (テ), from the word . The mark was introduced on February 8, 1887 (Meiji 20.2.8).

Usage 
To indicate a postal code, the mark is written first, and the postal code is written after. For example, one area of Meguro, Tokyo, would have 〒153-0061 written on any mail, in order to direct mail to that location. This usage has resulted in the inclusion of the mark into the Japanese character sets for computers, and thus eventually their inclusion into Unicode, where it can also be found on the Japanese Post Office emoji. In most keyboard-based Japanese input systems, it can be created by typing "yuubin" and then doing a kanji conversion.

Of the versions shown to the right, the one on the far right (〒) is the standard mark used in addressing. A circled yūbin mark  is often used on maps to denote post offices. Other variants have been used as conformity marks inherited from the Ministry of Communications: for example, a similar circled mark  was used for electrical certification of Category B appliances, contrasted with a triangle-enclosed postal mark (⮗) for Category A appliances, under a precursor to the Act on Product Safety of Electrical Appliances and Materials. The Unicode code chart, as of version 13.0, labels the "Circled Postal Mark" character (〶, U+3036) as "symbol for type B electronics". An enclosed version incorporating a sawtooth wave shape is used as a conformity mark for Ministry of Internal Affairs and Communications regulations on radio and other electromagnetic wave equipment.

Encoding 
The postal mark appears in the following encoded characters. Before the introduction of Unicode, the simple postal mark was encoded for Japanese use in JIS X 0208 (including the Shift JIS encoding). A mascot-stylised  was additionally included in some vendor extensions of Shift JIS, including the KanjiTalk 7 variant of MacJapanese, and become part of a standardised Shift JIS variant (at a different location) with the 2000 publication of JIS X 0213.

The ARIB extensions for JIS X 0208, specified by the Japanese broadcasting standards ARIB STD-B24 and ARIB STD-B62, includes a duplicate of the simple mark for use as a map symbol for a post office, as well as a circled variant.

Earlier editions of the North Korean standard KPS 9566, such as the 1997 edition, included both the simple postal mark and a version in a downward-pointing triangle, which was proposed by the North Korean national body for addition to Unicode in 2001. In response to this proposal, the South Korean national body requested evidence for the symbol's use in North Korea, noting that the Japanese-style postal mark is not used in South Korea, which uses a circled 우 (i.e. ㉾) for a similar purpose. A report from a subsequent meeting between North and South Korean representatives from ISO/IEC JTC 1/SC 2/WG 2 notes that the North Korean body had decided to review the character before discussing it further,  and it was subsequently removed from KPS 9566 in 2003, leaving only the simple mark. The version with an enclosing triangle was eventually added to Unicode in version 13.0, on the basis of established usage of both the circled and triangular versions in certification for electrical appliances in Japan, but also intended to correspond to the KPS 9566-97 character.

Emoji sets from Japanese cellular carriers included a building with a prominently displayed postal mark (in the simplest case, a postal mark enclosed within a building outline) as a pictograph for a post office; this was also adopted into Unicode in version 6.0. Although the most recent versions of Microsoft's Segoe UI Emoji also show a building, earlier versions from prior to Windows 10 Anniversary Update showed this emoji as a simple postal mark, appearing red in colour presentation.

See also 
 
 History of Japanese postal services
 Japanese addressing system
 Japanese typographic symbols
 Japanese map symbols
 Kazakhstani tenge (uses an almost identical symbol)

References

External links
 Official Postal site  (archived 4 July 2006)

1887 introductions
Symbols introduced in 1968
1887 establishments in Japan
1968 establishments in Japan
Communications in Japan
Typographical symbols
Emoji